Saint Rogelia (Spanish:Santa Rogelia) is a 1940 Spanish drama film directed by Roberto de Ribón and starring Germaine Montero, Rafael Rivelles and Juan de Landa. It was shot at Cinecitta in Rome as part of an agreement between Francisco Franco's Nationalists and the Italian government A separate Italian-language version The Sin of Rogelia Sanchez was produced at the same time. The film is based on the 1926 novel Santa Rogelia by Armando Palacio Valdés. It was remade in 1962 by Rafael Gil.

The film's sets were designed by Guido Fiorini.

Cast
 Germaine Montero as Rogelia  
 Rafael Rivelles as Fernando  
 Juan de Landa as Máximo  
 Pastora Peña as Cristina  
 Julia Caba Alba as Marciala  
 Luis Riera Sánchez 
 Porfiria Sanchíz as Presidenta de la Junta  
 Rafael Calvo as Dr. Olivar 
 Emilio García Ruiz as Pedro  
 Luis Peña padre as Pepe

References

Bibliography 
 Bentley, Bernard. A Companion to Spanish Cinema. Boydell & Brewer 2008.

External links 
 

1940 drama films
1940s multilingual films
Spanish drama films
1940 films
1940s Spanish-language films
Spanish multilingual films
Spanish black-and-white films
1940s Spanish films